Viola Poley (later Kowalschek, born 13 April 1955) is a German rower who competed for East Germany in the 1976 Summer Olympics.

She was born in Berlin in 1955. In 1976, she was a crew member of the East German boat, which won the gold medal in the quadruple sculls event under her maiden name. She competed at the 1977 World Rowing Championships in the coxed quad sculls under her married name and won gold. In February 1978, she was given the sports awards Honoured Master of Sports.

References

External links
 

1955 births
Living people
East German female rowers
Olympic rowers of East Germany
Rowers at the 1976 Summer Olympics
Olympic gold medalists for East Germany
Olympic medalists in rowing
World Rowing Championships medalists for East Germany
Medalists at the 1976 Summer Olympics
Rowers from Berlin
Recipients of the Honoured Master of Sport
20th-century German women